Laurina Monique Fazer (born 13 October 2003) is a French professional footballer who plays as a midfielder for Division 1 Féminine club Paris Saint-Germain.

Club career
Fazer is a youth academy graduate of Paris Saint-Germain. She joined the club in 2010 from ASC Val d'Argenteuil at the age of six. On 18 June 2020, she signed her first professional contract with the club until June 2023. She made her official debut for the club on 14 November 2020 in a 14–0 league win against Issy.

International career
Fazer is a French youth international. In July 2022, she captained the French team at the 2022 FIFA U-20 Women's World Cup.

In September 2022, Fazer received her first call-up to the France national team.

Personal life
Born in mainland France, Fazer is of Guadeloupean descent through her father and Malagasy descent through her mother.

Career statistics

Honours
Paris Saint-Germain
 Division 1 Féminine: 2020–21
 Coupe de France: 2021–22

Individual
 Trophées UNFP du football Young Player of the Year: 2021–2022

 Sud Ladies Cup Best Player: 2022
 Sud Ladies Cup Best XI: 2022

References

External links
 
 

2003 births
Living people
Black French sportspeople
French sportspeople of Malagasy descent
French people of Guadeloupean descent
Sportspeople from Argenteuil
Footballers from Val-d'Oise
Women's association football midfielders
French women's footballers
France women's youth international footballers
Paris Saint-Germain Féminine players
Division 1 Féminine players